The Communauté de communes Les Avant-Monts is a communauté de communes in the Hérault département and in the Occitanie region of France. Its seat is in Magalas. Its area is 353.4 km2. Its population was 27,144 in 2018.

It was created on 1 January 2017 by the merger of the Communauté de communes des Avant-Monts du Centre Hérault and the Communauté de communes Orb et Taurou. The Communauté de communes des Avant-Monts du Centre Hérault was created on 1 January 2013  through the merging of Communauté de communes Coteaux et Châteaux, Communauté de communes Framps 909 and Communauté de communes Faugères.

Composition
The communauté de communes consists of the following 25 communes:

Abeilhan
Autignac
Cabrerolles
Causses-et-Veyran
Caussiniojouls
Faugères
Fos
Fouzilhon
Gabian
Laurens
Magalas
Margon
Montesquieu
Murviel-lès-Béziers
Neffiès
Pailhès
Pouzolles
Puimisson
Puissalicon
Roquessels
Roujan
Saint-Geniès-de-Fontedit
Saint-Nazaire-de-Ladarez
Thézan-lès-Béziers
Vailhan

References

External links
Official Website

Avant-Monts
Avant-Monts